Eguga was a civitas in Africa Proconsulare during the Roman Empire. It was located in present-day Tunisia. The city was also the seat of an ancient Roman Catholic diocese.

Eguga was a suffragan of the Archdiocese of Carthage. The only bishop mentioned by the sources was Florencio, who took part in the antimonothelite Council of Carthage in 646. Today Eguga survives as a titular bishopric the current bishop being Gerard William Battersby, of Detroit.

References

Catholic titular sees in Africa
Former Roman Catholic dioceses in Africa
Roman towns and cities in Tunisia